"Let's Go Away for Awhile" is an instrumental by the American rock band the Beach Boys from their 1966 album Pet Sounds. It was composed and produced by Brian Wilson, and performed by uncredited session musicians later known as the Wrecking Crew. The track is the first of two instrumentals that appear on the album, the other being its title track.

The piece was intended to have a vocal, but Wilson ultimately decided that it did not need one. He later called it his favorite instrumental that he ever wrote, and commented that it was possibly influenced by Burt Bacharach's music. Several months after the album's release, the track was issued as the B-side to the band's single "Good Vibrations".

Background and composition

"Let's Go Away for Awhile" was composed by Brian Wilson and provisionally titled "The Old Man and The Baby". Wilson surmised that he may have subconsciously based the chord progression on the music of Burt Bacharach. Bacharach's "Are You There (With Another Girl)", in particular, may have directly influenced Wilson to write "Let's Go Away for Awhile". Musicologist James Perone wrote of the track:

An early full working title was "Let's Go Away for Awhile (And Then We'll Have World Peace)"—the parenthetical being a reference to Del Close and John Brent's 1959 comedy album How to Speak Hip. Tony Asher explained:

Recording
The bulk of "Let's Go Away for Awhile" was recorded on January 18, 1966 at United Western Recorders. String and flute overdubs were recorded the next day. Wilson stated: "We used dynamics like Beethoven. You know, Beethoven, the dynamic music maker." In 1966, Wilson considered the track to be "the finest piece of art" he had made up to that point, and that every component of its production "worked perfectly". A year later he expounded,

In 1995, it emerged that the final Pet Sounds session was originally intended to add vocals to "Let's Go Away for Awhile", but Capitol insisted that the session date be the only one used for the album's entire mixing.

Reception
Cash Box said that it is "a moody instrumental track."

Other releases
It was included as the B-side of the Beach Boys' October 1966 single "Good Vibrations".
It appears on the Neil Young soundtrack album Journey Through the Past as the closing track.
It is featured on the soundtrack to the 2017 film Baby Driver.

Personnel
Per Alan Boyd and Craig Slowinski.

Session musicians (also known as "the Wrecking Crew")

The Sid Sharp Strings

Cover versions

 1995 – Sean Macreavy, Dumb Angel
 1998 – John McEntire, Smiling Pets
 2002 – Brian Wilson, Pet Sounds Live
 2012 – Neil Cowley Trio, MOJO Presents Pet Sounds Revisited
 2013 – Fairmont, Mint 400 Records Presents The Beach Boys Pet Sounds

References

1966 instrumentals
1966 songs
The Beach Boys songs
Songs written by Brian Wilson
Song recordings produced by Brian Wilson
Lounge music